Coleville is an extinct town in Bates County, in the U.S. state of Missouri. The GNIS classifies it as a populated place.

Coleville was platted in 1859 by Samuel Cole, who gave the community his last name. A post office called Coleville was established in 1871, and remained in operation until 1879.

References

Ghost towns in Missouri
Former populated places in Bates County, Missouri